Elbert H. Smith was the author of the best selling epic poem Ma-ka-tai-me-she-kia-kiak in 1839.

References 

Full text of Ma-ka-tai-me-she-kia-kiak

19th-century American poets
American male poets
Year of death missing
Year of birth missing
19th-century male writers